Jessica Cecille Walsh (born 16 May 1971) is an Australian politician and trade unionist. She is a member of the Australian Labor Party (ALP) and has served as a Senator for Victoria since 2019. Prior to her election to parliament she was the state secretary of United Voice.

Early life
Walsh was born in Melbourne. She grew up in the suburb of North Balwyn. She holds the degrees of Bachelor of Arts (Hons.) from the University of Melbourne, Master of Arts from the University of Southern California, and Doctor of Philosophy in labour studies from the University of Melbourne. Her doctoral thesis was titled "Organising the low-wage service sector: labour, community and urban politics in the United States".

Walsh is one of eleven MPs in the 46th Parliament of Australia who possesses a PhD, the others being Katie Allen, Fiona Martin, Anne Aly, Andrew Leigh, Daniel Mulino, Jim Chalmers, Adam Bandt, Mehreen Faruqi, Anne Webster and Helen Haines.

Career
From 1998 to 2000 Walsh was a research fellow at two progressive think tanks in the United States, the Institute for Policy Studies and the Economic Policy Institute. There she researched "the loss of decent, stable manufacturing jobs and the growth in their place of low-paid and insecure work in service industries". After returning to Australia, Walsh worked as a researcher and organiser for the Victorian branch of United Voice from 2002 to 2006. She then served as assistant state secretary from 2006 to 2007 and as state secretary from 2007 to 2019.

Politics
Walsh joined the ALP in 2005. In 2018 she won ALP preselection for the Senate in second position on the party's ticket in Victoria. The party's left faction demoted incumbent senator Gavin Marshall to the third spot after Raff Ciccone and Walsh. She was elected to the Senate at the 2019 federal election, with Marshall losing his seat.

References 

1971 births
Living people
Australian trade unionists
21st-century Australian politicians
21st-century Australian women politicians
Women members of the Australian Senate
Australian Labor Party members of the Parliament of Australia
Labor Left politicians
Members of the Australian Senate for Victoria
University of Melbourne alumni
University of Melbourne women
University of Southern California alumni
People from Balwyn, Victoria
Politicians from Melbourne